The bumblebee fish (Brachygobius xanthozonus) is a species of fresh and brackish water goby native to Thailand and Indonesia.  This species can reach a length of  SL and is found in lower parts of rivers, coastal areas, mangroves and highly vegetated areas.

Taxonomy
Brachygobius xanthozona is distinct from many of the other species in the genus Brachygobius and has been placed by some ichthyologists in the genus Hypogymnogobius. It is very rare in the wild, and has not been imported as an aquarium fish, despite the widespread use of the name in the aquarium literature.

References

xanthozonus
Freshwater fish of Indonesia
Fish described in 1849